The Battle of San Romano is a set of three paintings by the Florentine painter Paolo Uccello depicting events that took place at the Battle of San Romano between Florentine and Sienese forces in 1432. They are significant as revealing the development of linear perspective in early Italian Renaissance painting, and are unusual as a major secular commission. The paintings are in egg tempera on wooden panels, each over 3 metres long. According to the National Gallery, the panels were commissioned by a member of the Bartolini Salimbeni family in Florence sometime between 1435 and 1460. The paintings were much admired in the 15th century; Lorenzo de' Medici so coveted them that he purchased one and had the remaining two forcibly removed to the Palazzo Medici. They are now divided between three collections, the National Gallery, London, the Galleria degli Uffizi, Florence, and the Musée du Louvre, Paris.

Subject

The three paintings are:

The Uffizi panel was probably designed to be the central painting of the triptych and is the only one signed by the artist.  The sequence most widely agreed among art historians is: London, Uffizi, Louvre, although others have been proposed.  They may represent different times of day: dawn (London), mid-day (Florence) and dusk (Paris) – the battle lasted eight hours.

In the London painting, Niccolò da Tolentino, with his large gold and red patterned hat, is seen leading the Florentine cavalry. He had a reputation for recklessness, and doesn't even wear a helmet, though he sent two messengers (the departure of the two messengers, depicted centre, top) to tell his allied army of Attendolo to hurry to his aid as he is facing a superior force. In the foreground, broken lances and a dead soldier are carefully aligned into orthogonals, so as to create an impression of perspective. Similar to that of a tapestry, the landscape rises up in a picture plane as opposed to receding deeply into space. This illusion of a backdrop and a perspective theme resembling a stage, depicts the war as a theatrical ceremony. The three paintings were designed to be hung high on three different walls of a room, and the perspective designed with that height in mind, which accounts for many apparent anomalies in the perspective when seen in photos or at normal gallery height.

Many areas of the paintings were covered with gold and silver leaf. While the gold leaf, such as that found on the decorations of the bridles, has remained bright, the silver leaf, found particularly on the armour of the soldiers, has oxidized to a dull grey or black.  The original impression of the burnished silver would have been dazzling.  All of the paintings, especially that in the Louvre, have suffered from time and early restoration, and many areas have lost their modelling.

The panels were a subject in the BBC series The Private Life of a Masterpiece (2005).

References in popular culture
The dark horse in the Louvre panel, mounted by Micheletto Attendolo (da Cotignola), can be seen painted in a tapestry, in the first segment ("Metzengerstein") of the 1968 omnibus film Spirits of the Dead.
In the 4th Episode (Lucrezia's Wedding) of the 2011 TV Series The Borgias, the London and Louvre panel is shown adorning the dining hall walls of the Florentine Prince when cardinal Della Rovere visits him in Florence.

See also

Italian Renaissance painting
Funerary Monument to Sir John Hawkwood
Equestrian Statue of Niccolò da Tolentino
The Annunciation and Seven Saints by Filippo Lippi, also from the decoration of Palazzo Medici
 100 Great Paintings

References

External links

Further reading
 Harrington, Peter, "Military history's loss is Art History's Gain," Quarterly Journal of Military History, Vol. 16, No. 1, Autumn 2003, pp. 44–49.
 Starn, Randolph and Loren Partridge, "Representing war in the Renaissance: The shield of Paolo Uccello," Representations, No. 5, Winter 1984, 33–65.

Paintings in the collection of the Uffizi
Collections of the National Gallery, London
Paintings in the Louvre by Italian artists
1440s paintings
1450s paintings
Paintings by Paolo Uccello
War paintings
Military art
Painting series
Triptychs
Horses in art